The 2014 FILA Wrestling World Cup - Men's freestyle was the first of a set of three Wrestling World Cups in 2014 - one for each major discipline. The event took place in Los Angeles, California March 15 and 16, 2014.

Pool stage

Pool A

Pool B

Medal Matches

Final classement

See also
2014 FILA Wrestling World Cup - Women's freestyle
2014 FILA Wrestling World Cup - Men's Greco-Roman

References

External links
FILA Men's Freestyle World Cup Wrap and Results
Iran Three-Peats As Americans Capture Bronze at Freestyle World Cup

FILA Wrestling World Cup - Men's
FILA Wrestling World Cup - Men's
FILA Wrestling World Cup - Men's
International wrestling competitions hosted by the United States
Men's Freestyle
FILA Wrestling World Cup - Men's